is a Japanese curler.

Career
Motohashi was a member of Team Aomori which represented Japan at two Winter Olympics (2006 and 2010). She threw second stones for Ayumi Onodera at the 2006 Winter Olympics, finishing 7th, and played second for Moe Meguro at the 2010 Winter Olympics, finishing 8th. She skipped the Japan team at the 2002 World Junior Curling Championships, finishing last. She has also played for Japan at five World Curling Championships: 2004 (7th), 2005 (9th), 2007 (9th), 2008 (4th) & 2010 (11th).

After playing for the Meguro rink from 2007 to 2010, Motohashi began skipping her own team. She has yet to represent Japan internationally as a skip on the senior level.

On the World Curling Tour, Motohashi won the 2007 Meyers Norris Penny Charity Classic and the 2009 Twin Anchors Invitational while playing for Meguro, and later skipped her own rink to win the 2014 Avonair Cash Spiel.

Founded own rink "Loco Solare", a.k.a. "LS Kitami" in her hometown Tokoro, Kitami in Aug. 2010.
The team members are all local members but achieved international success as the 2nd place in the 2016 World Women's Curling Championship in Swift Current.

Motohashi was part of the Japanese team that won the 2018 Olympics women curling bronze medal.

In June 2018, Motohashi announced that she would rest for a while from a top curling player and concentrate on training young players.

In 2021, she took over the Miki Hayashi rink as their skip.

Personal life
Motohashi graduated from Nippon Sport Science University. Her nickname is 'Marilyn' named after her given name.
Holding Teacher's License for Junior High School - Grade 2 in Japan (health and physical training).
She was awarded as an honorary citizen of Kitami City.

Teammates

Grand Slam record

Former events

References

External links
 
 Curling  Athlete Profile: Mari MOTOHASHI - Pyeongchang 2018
 MariLog: Official blog by Mari Motohashi (in Japanese)
 Loco Solare, a.k.a. LS Kitami: Official site (in Japanese)

Japanese female curlers
Living people
1986 births
People from Kitami, Hokkaido
Curlers at the 2006 Winter Olympics
Curlers at the 2010 Winter Olympics
Olympic curlers of Japan
Continental Cup of Curling participants
Asian Games medalists in curling
Curlers at the 2017 Asian Winter Games
Medalists at the 2017 Asian Winter Games
Asian Games bronze medalists for Japan
Universiade medalists in curling
Curlers at the 2018 Winter Olympics
Medalists at the 2018 Winter Olympics
Olympic bronze medalists for Japan
Olympic medalists in curling
Pacific-Asian curling champions
Universiade bronze medalists for Japan
Competitors at the 2007 Winter Universiade
Medalists at the 2007 Winter Universiade
20th-century Japanese women
21st-century Japanese women